The Tiroler Volksbund was a Pan-Germanist association founded on May 5, 1905.

The organization was dedicated to the idea that Tyrol should remain united and opposed movement toward autonomy in the southern Trentino region. It promoted an anti-Italian program of Germanization in the southern region.

In his 1911 pamphlet Il Trentino veduto da un socialista, Benito Mussolini gives an overview of the situation in Trentino: On the one hand, there are Pan-German organizations such as Volksbund, the Deutscher Schulverein and Süd-Mark, while from other hand you have associations in defense of Italian language and cultural such as the Lega Nazionale e le società Pro Patria.

In 1919 it changed its name to the Andreas-Hofer-Bund Tirol. During the 1920s and 1930s it collaborated with Deutscher Schulverein to finance a system of clandestine German schools. The organization was dissolved in 1938, after the Anschluss, by order of the Third Reich. 

On August the 15, 1994 the association has been re-founded.

References 

 
 Il Tiroler Volksbund e la sua opera : traduzione dall'Almanacco pel Volksbund Tirolese per l'anno 1908, per cura della Lega Nazionale (sezione tridentina), Trento, Scotoni, 1908.

Organizations established in 1905
Organizations disestablished in 1938
1905 establishments in Austria-Hungary
1938 disestablishments in Italy
German nationalism in Austria
German nationalist political parties
Nationalist parties in Italy
Andreas Hofer